Oscar F. Fellows (September 10, 1857December 18, 1921) was an American attorney politician from Maine. A Republican from Bucksport, Fellows served two terms in the Maine House of Representatives (19011904). In his second term, he was elected Speaker.

As an attorney, Fellows was President of the Maine State Bar Association. He was a partner in the law firm of Fellows and Fellows in Bangor with his sons, Frank Fellows and Raymond. Frank Fellows represented Maine's third congressional district in the U.S. house of representatives from 1941 to 1957. Raymond Fellows was Maine Attorney General during the Owen Brewster administration (19251928). Oscar Fellows was a member of the International Commission Pertaining to the St. John River.

References

1857 births
1921 deaths
Maine lawyers
People from Bucksport, Maine
Speakers of the Maine House of Representatives
Republican Party members of the Maine House of Representatives
19th-century American lawyers